Clarence Nelson may refer to:

 Bill Nelson (Clarence William Nelson II, born 1942), American politician
 Clarence H. Nelson (1901–1968), Los Angeles physician

See also
Vui Clarence Nelson (born 1955), Samoan judge